The  Chrysler VE Valiant  is an automobile that was produced in Australia by Chrysler Australia from 1967 to 1969. It was released in October 1967, replacing the Chrysler VC Valiant. The premium model in the range was renamed Valiant VIP due to the V8 engine becoming an option across the entire range.

Model range
The VE series Valiant was offered in 4-door sedan, 5-door station wagon and 2-door coupe utility models.
 Valiant sedan (VE-M41)
 Valiant Safari wagon (VE-M45)
 Valiant Regal sedan (VE-H41)
 Valiant Regal Safari wagon (VE-H45)
 Valiant VIP sedan (VE-P41)
 Valiant VIP Safari wagon (VE-P45)
 Valiant utility (VE-L20)
 Valiant Wayfarer utility (VE-M20)

VE series Valiant and Valiant Wayfarer utility models were introduced in May 1968.

Dodge utility
A variant of the Valiant utility was marketed as the Dodge utility. (VE-E20) The Dodge was equipped with painted grille and bumpers unlike the chromed examples fitted to VE Valiants.

Changes
The VE Valiant was larger than any previous Valiant model. Styling was based on that of the US Dodge Dart and Plymouth Valiant models with no body panels carried over from the VC Valiant. While the styling from the A-pillar back was Australian-influenced, sheeting forward of the A-pillar and bonnet was that of the U.S Dart/Valiant models with the exception of the grille which was convex on the Australian models as opposed to concave on the U.S models. Also new in the VE range were dual-line brakes, double-sided safety wheel rims, front safety belts and power-assisted front disc brakes on V8 models. The Valiant VIP (four-door performance model) was offered for the first time, the new model featuring the V8 engine, automatic transmission, power steering, front disc brakes and reclining front seats.

Engines and transmissions
A 145 bhp  Straight-six, a 160 bhp  "High Performance" Straight-six and a 195 bhp  V8 engine were available, the VE being the first series to be offered with a choice of three engines. Three speed manual and three-speed "Torque-Flite" automatic transmissions were offered. The V8 engine and automatic transmission were standard on the VIP.

Awards

The VE Valiant was announced as the winner of the Wheels magazine Car of the Year award in January 1968.

Production and replacement
A total of 68,688 VE Valiants were built prior to its replacement by the VF Valiant range in March 1969.

See also
 Chrysler Valiant

References

Cars of Australia
Valiant vehicles
Valiant
Cars introduced in 1967
1960s cars